Dark Night is a 2016 American drama film directed by Tim Sutton. It is based on the 2012 Aurora, Colorado shooting. It was screened in the Horizons section at the 73rd Venice International Film Festival. The film took place in Los Angeles, California.

Cast
 Robert Jumper as Jumper
 Anna Rose Hopkins as Summer
 Rosie Rodriguez
 Karina Macias
 Aaron Purvis as Aaron
 Eddie Cacciola as Veteran

Reception
On the review aggregator website Rotten Tomatoes, the film holds an approval rating of 62%, based on 52 reviews, with an average rating of 5.95/10. The website's critical consensus reads, "Dark Nights narrative coherence isn't always on par with its visual beauty, but for patient viewers, it adds up to an absorbing, thought-provoking, and thoroughly singular statement." On Metacritic, the film has a weighted average score of 60 out of 100, based on 22 critics, indicating "mixed or average reviews".

References

External links
 
 
 

2016 films
2016 drama films
American drama films
Drama films based on actual events
Crime films based on actual events
Films set in 2012
2010s English-language films
2010s American films